Lane control may refer to:

 Reversible lane, a lane in which traffic may travel in either direction
 Lane control lights, a type of traffic light used to manage traffic, as for a reversible lane
 Lane control (cycling), a vehicular cycling practice